Isabelle Pasco (born 25 April 1966) is a French actress and model.

Pasco was born in Perpignan. She began her career as a model, modelling for photographers including: Paolo Roversi; Peter Lindberg; David Lachapelle; Helmut Newton; Antony Armstrong-Jones, 1st Earl of Snowdon; and Bettina Rheims.

She began acting in her native south of France, chosen for the role of Sissi in Outside the Law directed by Robin Davis. She then relocated to Paris, cast in Jean-Jacques Beineix production of Roselyne et les lions, for which she trained for nine months as a lion trainer.

In 2013, she starred in the Parisien stage production of A Clockwork Orange.

She was married to the actor Tchéky Karyo on 21 December 1995, but they were later divorced.

Films

References

External links
 

French television actresses
French film actresses
1966 births
Living people
People from Perpignan